A squeegee man or squeegee woman, squeegee kid (Canada), squeegee boy (Baltimore), squeegee punk (Montreal), squeegee merchant (London), squeegee guy or squeegee bandit is a person who, using a washcloth and squeegee, wipes windshields of cars stopped in traffic, in exchange for money.

By country

Canada
In Toronto, Vancouver, Calgary, and Winnipeg, they are known as squeegee kids and they are mostly tolerated, since they are considered to be working for money, rather than begging.  In Montreal, they are often called squeegee punks, in reference to their appearance, or simply squeegees. In 1999, the Ontario government passed the Safe Streets Act, outlawing squeegee kids and aggressive public begging. The Government of British Columbia has adopted a word for word version of the Ontario Safe Street Act. Squeegee kids have become scarce in Toronto, Ontario and Vancouver, BC, as police frequently stop them and check their identities for outstanding arrest warrants.

In 2011, then Deputy Mayor of Toronto Doug Holyday told the Toronto Sun that there was the will in council to step up action against panhandlers, including squeegee kids; the proposition was mocked by some media, given the previous efforts, and the suggestion that the homeless would have to pay fines.

United Kingdom
Londoners, and perhaps others, extend the appellation to include those who roam in the midst of stopped traffic to not only wash windscreens, but also hawk items such as roses and newspapers. For this reason, they are sometimes called squeegee merchants.

United States
In New York City in the 1980s, the usual procedure would involve groups of squeegee men surrounding cars stopped in traffic. Although some merely provided a service, in other cases the windshield-washing would be carried out without asking, often perfunctorily, and with subsequent demands for money, sometimes with added threats of smashing the car's windshield. Upon his election, mayor Rudy Giuliani famously sought to remove squeegee men from the streets as part of his quality-of-life campaign, claiming that their near-ubiquitous presence created an environment of disorder that encouraged more serious crime to flourish. Squeegee men disappeared from city streets during Giuliani's mayoralty and did not reappear in significant numbers.

Squeegee men were among the first targeted by Mayor Rudolph Giuliani and Commissioner William Bratton. In his book Leadership, Giuliani explained that his method of removing the squeegee men from the street involved arresting them. Patrolmen who first made the arrests saw that the squeegee men were released immediately, because according to the New York penal code at the time, cleaning someone's windshield was not illegal. Giuliani told the officers that if they saw any more squeegee men they should simply arrest them for jaywalking.

Squeegee men (or "squeegee boys" for younger examples) remain prevalent in Baltimore, Maryland.

See also
 Crossing sweeper
 S.P.I.T.: Squeegee Punks in Traffic

References

External links
A 1999 report from BBC News on the decision of London's Westminster City Council to crack down on the squeegee "menace".
An excerpt from Hansard, the record of the British House of Commons, about squeegee merchants.
A 2001 documentary film about squeegee punks in Canada

Informal occupations
Urban decay
Homelessness
Car windows
Cleaning and maintenance occupations